Zora Rozsypalová (3 September 1922 – 23 January 2010) was a Czech stage and film actress. At the 1994 Thalia Awards she was honoured in the lifetime achievement in theatre category. She acted 230 roles at theatres in the cities of Jihlava, Olomouc and Ostrava, where she moved in 1961, and stayed until 1991. Her first film role was in the 1950 film The Great Opportunity, although it was more than a decade until she appeared in another film. Rozsypalová's last, minor, film role was in the 2006 Věra Chytilová film, Pleasant Moments.

Selected filmography
Veliká příležitost (1950)
 (1972)
Pleasant Moments (2006)

References

External links

1922 births
2010 deaths
Czech stage actresses
Czechoslovak stage actresses
Czech film actresses
Czechoslovak film actresses
People from Kroměříž
20th-century Czech actresses
21st-century Czech actresses
Recipients of the Thalia Award